Perfectly Reasonable Deviations from the Beaten Track: The Letters of Richard P. Feynman is a collection of Nobel Prize winner Richard Feynman's letters.

The book was edited by his daughter, Michelle Feynman, and includes a foreword by Timothy Ferris. The book is also titled Don't You Have Time to Think?

References

External links
 Interview with Michelle Feynman
 National Public Radio: The daughter of Richard Feynman talks about a new book of his collected letters
 WNYC Radio: Eight sample letters from the book
 About this book from Basic Books, the publisher

Works by Richard Feynman